Diego Fernández de Cevallos Ramos (born 16 March 1941) is a Mexican politician affiliated with the conservative National Action Party (PAN). He was a  presidential candidate in the 1994 election and President of the Mexican Senate.

Life and career
Fernández de Cevallos was born in Mexico City, the son of José Fernández de Cevallos Martínez and Beatriz Ramos Íñigo. He received a bachelor's degree in law from the National Autonomous University of Mexico (UNAM) and took several courses in economics at the Ibero-American University, where he also worked as a professor of criminal and commercial law.

He joined the conservative National Action Party (PAN) in 1959 and led its parliamentary group in the Chamber of Deputies (during the 55th legislature) and in the Senate (2003–06). In 1994 he ran for president representing his party and lost against the PRI candidate, Ernesto Zedillo Ponce de León.

Outside politics, Fernández de Cevallos runs an influential law firm specialized in criminal, civil and commercial law. He was married only by the religious rite to Claudia Gutiérrez Navarrete. Currently he lives with his partner Liliana de León Maldonado.

At 80 years of age Fernández de Cevallos decided to join social media in order to persuade young people to adopt conservative values. President Andrés Manuel López Obrador (AMLO) responded to Fernández de Cevallos' criticisms of his government by showing a video of a debate they had in 2000.

Abduction
Fernández de Cevallos was abducted from one of his properties, located in Pedro Escobedo, Querétaro, on 14 May 2010. His abandoned vehicle was found nearby, with signs of a violent struggle. Fernandez de Cevallos' kidnappers demanded $100 million in exchange for his release, but decreased the amount. He was released from this abduction on December 20, 2010 in exchange for an amount that hasn't been officially disclosed by him or his family.

See also
List of kidnappings
List of solved missing person cases

References

External links
 PAN Parliamentary Group: Diego Fernández de Cevallos
 La Jornada: El entramado del legislador y litigante

1941 births
2010s missing person cases
20th-century Mexican lawyers
20th-century Mexican politicians
21st-century Mexican lawyers
21st-century Mexican politicians
Candidates in the 1994 Mexican presidential election
Formerly missing people
Kidnapped politicians
Living people
Members of the Senate of the Republic (Mexico)
National Action Party (Mexico) politicians
National Autonomous University of Mexico alumni
Members of the Chamber of Deputies (Mexico)
Missing person cases in Mexico
Presidents of the Senate of the Republic (Mexico)
Universidad Iberoamericana alumni